The 2011 Sylvania 300 was a NASCAR Cup Series stock car race that was held on September 25, 2011 at New Hampshire Motor Speedway in Loudon, New Hampshire. Contested 300 laps on the 1.058-mile (1.702 km) asphalt oval, it was the 28th race of the 2011 Sprint Cup Series season, as well as the second race in the ten-race Chase for the Sprint Cup, which ends the season. The race was won by Tony Stewart for the Stewart Haas Racing team. Brad Keselowski finished second, and Greg Biffle clinched third.

References

Sylvania 300
Sylvania 300
NASCAR races at New Hampshire Motor Speedway
September 2011 sports events in the United States